Hav-A-Tampa is a cigar brand currently owned by ITG Brands. It was founded in Tampa in 1902. The company's slogan "Won't you Hav-A-Tampa cigar?" was one of a handful that propelled the city towards the nickname "Cigar City." Its signature product, the "Tampa Jewel" cigar, became widely distributed to service-members in Europe. The factory was located in Ybor City. In 1996, the firm made $140 million on 859 million cigars. In December of 1997 the company was sold to Tabacalera for $275 million dollars. Later, the company was merged into the new company Altadis in 1999, which was later sold to Imperial Tobacco. The Ybor factory was shuttered in 2009, the cigars are now rolled in Puerto Rico. The company was also the first to employ the wooden tip.

References

Cigar brands
Tobacco brands